Arthrology is the science concerned with the study of anatomy, function, dysfunction and treatment of joints and articulations.

The prefix "arthro-" refers to joints, as in arthrogram, arthroscopy, or arthritis, from the Greek ἄρθρον arthron. Arthrology is also called as arthrologia, syndesmologia, syndesmology, and synosteology. Specialists in this filed are known as arthrologists.

References 

 
Joints